Pozuel may refer to several places:

 Pozuel del Campo, a town in the province of Teruel, Aragón, Spain
 Pozuel de Ariza, a town in the province of Zaragoza, Aragón, Spain